James W. "Jim" Nichols (born June 19, 1946) was an American farmer and politician.

Career 
Nichols lived in Lake Benton, Lincoln County, Minnesota and was a farmer. He received his bachelor's degree from University of Minnesota Morris. Nichols served in the Minnesota Senate from 1977 to 1981 and was a Democrat. He then served as the commissioner of the Minnesota Department of Agriculture from 1982 to 1990.

References

1946 births
Living people
People from Lincoln County, Minnesota
University of Minnesota Morris alumni
Farmers from Minnesota
Democratic Party Minnesota state senators
State cabinet secretaries of Minnesota